Jovino Novoa (31 March 1945 – 1 June 2021) was a Chilean politician. He was a member of the Senate of Chile (1998–2014) and was the president of the Senate of Chile (2009–2010).

He served as General Undersecretary of Augusto Pinochet's dictatorship from 1979 to 1982.

Unlike many others in his party, the Independent Democratic Union, Novoa was not religious and considered himself agnostic, and at times he voiced support several pro-choice positions. Likewise, within the UDI he achieved to establish the dominance of his liberal-conservative faction, which coexisted with Pablo Longueira's social-conservative current. This last one had as its characteristic the political work in poor sectors, whereas Novoa's faction was concentrated in the relation with businessmen, the empowerment of think tanks like Libertad y Desarrollo (LyD) or the training of then young or students' leaders from Pontifical Catholic University of Chile (PUC) like Jaime Bellolio or Javier Macaya.

In 2015, he was sentenced for tax crimes related to the Penta and SQM cases. Six years later, Novoa died on 1 June 2021, aged 76, from emphysema.

See also
 Corruption in Chile

References

1945 births
2021 deaths
20th-century Chilean politicians
21st-century Chilean politicians
20th-century Chilean lawyers
Chilean agnostics
Presidents of the Senate of Chile
Members of the Senate of Chile
Independent Democratic Union politicians
Pontifical Catholic University of Chile alumni
People from Santiago
Chilean politicians convicted of crimes
Deaths from emphysema
Grand Crosses of the Order of the Liberator General San Martin